Tinian Municipality is one of the four constituent municipalities of the Northern Mariana Islands. It consists of the islands of Tinian and Aguijan and their offshore islets. The 2000 census population was 3,540 persons, all living on the island of Tinian (Aguijan is uninhabited). The municipal seat and main village of the island of Tinian is San Jose, situated on the southwest coast.

References

Tinian
Geography of the Northern Mariana Islands